Tessier and Teissier are surnames of French origin. Notable people with the surname include:

Albert Tessier (1895–1976), French-Canadian priest, historian, and filmmaker
Bernard Teissier (born 1945), French mathematician
Charles Tessier (c. 1550 – after 1604), French composer and lutenist
Christian Tessier (born 1978), Canadian actor
Claude Tessier (born 1943), French politician from Quebec
Dan Tessier (born 1979), Canadian professional ice hockey player
Élizabeth Teissier (born 1938), French astrologer and former actress
Emilie de Tessier (1850–1890), French cartoonist who worked under the pseudonym Marie Duval
François-Xavier Tessier (1799–1835), Canadian doctor, publisher, and political figure
Guy Teissier (born 1945), Member of the National Assembly of France.
Henri Antoine Marie Teissier (1929–2020), French Catholic Bishop, Archbishop Emeritus of Algiers
Joseph-Adolphe Tessier (1861–1928), Canadian politician from Quebec
Jules Tessier (1852–1934), Canadian lawyer and politician from Quebec
Mary Teissier (1917–1990), Ukrainian-French socialite and mistress of J. Paul Getty
Odette Teissier du Cros (1906-1997), French ethnologist, curator
Orval Tessier (born 1933), Canadian professional ice hockey player
Paul Tessier (1917–2008), French surgeon in the field of craniofacial surgery
Pierre Le Tessier (1255–1325), French cardinal
Robert Tessier (1934–1990), American actor and stuntman
Thomas Tessier (born 1947), American author of horror novels and short stories
Ulric-Joseph Tessier (1817–1892), Canadian lawyer, judge, and politician from Quebec

See also
Teisseire (disambiguation)